Flight 431 may refer to:

NLM CityHopper Flight 431, crashed on 6 October 1981
Kenya Airways Flight 431, crashed on 30 January 2000

0431